Henry George Teigan (August 7, 1881 – March 12, 1941) was an American labor leader and editor who served as a member of the United States House of Representatives from Minnesota.

Background 
Henry Teigan was born in Forest City, Winnebago County, Iowa. He attended  Luther Academy in Albert Lea, Minnesota and Central College in Pella, Iowa, later graduating from Valparaiso University in 1908. From 1900 to 1913 he was a teacher in various communities. (Iowa rural schools: 1900 – 1904, Des Lacs, North Dakota: 1909 – 1910, and Logan, North Dakota: 1912 – 1913).

Career 
He became involved in politics in 1913, serving as secretary of the North Dakota State Socialist Party until 1916. Teigan moved to Minneapolis, in 1917, where he served as secretary of the National Nonpartisan League from 1916 to 1923.  From 1923 to 1925, he was secretary to Senator Magnus Johnson. At that time, he also began working as an editor and newspaper writer. In 1930 he was the Minnesota Farmer Labor Party nominee for state auditor, coming in second with 35.96% of the vote. He continued in newspaper work until 1932, when he was elected to the Minnesota Senate where he served one term.

In 1936, he was elected as a candidate of the Minnesota Farmer Labor Party to the 75th congress. After one term, he failed to win reelection, and was also defeated in a 1940 bid to regain his seat. After leaving congress, he resumed newspaper and editorial work in Minneapolis, until his death on March 12, 1941. He is interred in Hillside Cemetery in Minneapolis. The papers of Henry George Teigan are maintained by the Minnesota Historical Society
in St. Paul, MN.

References

Other sources

External links 
 Guide to Research Collections. Teigan, Henry George, 1881-1941

 Nonpartisan League
 Luther Academy 1888-1928

1881 births
1941 deaths
Members of the United States House of Representatives from Minnesota
Minnesota state senators
Valparaiso University alumni
Central College (Iowa) alumni
American Lutherans
American people of Norwegian descent
Socialist Party of America politicians from North Dakota
Nonpartisan League politicians
Minnesota Farmer–Laborites
Farmer–Labor Party members of the United States House of Representatives
People from Forest City, Iowa
20th-century American politicians
20th-century Lutherans